Charles McGraw (born Charles Crisp Butters; May 10, 1914 – July 29, 1980) was an American stage, film and television actor whose career spanned more than three decades.

Early life
McGraw was born to Beatrice (née Crisp) and Francis P. Butters in Des Moines, Iowa. Federal census records indicate that he later moved with his parents to Akron, Ohio, where his father worked as a salesman and service manager. In January 1932, McGraw graduated from high school in Akron and then attended one semester of college.

His early jobs included working on a freighter and dancing in night clubs.

Career

Stage
Before getting into film, McGraw was active in theatrical road companies. He also appeared in "dozens of off-Broadway productions."

Film
McGraw made his first film in 1942 with a small, uncredited role in The Undying Monster at Fox. He was in Tonight We Raid Calais (1942) and They Came to Blow Up America (1943) at the same studio, and also Two Tickets to London (1943), Destroyer (1943), Corvette K-225 (1943), The Mad Ghoul (1943), The Impostor (1944), and The Seventh Cross (1944). 

He developed into a leading man, especially in the film noir genre, during the late 1940s and early 1950s. His gravelly voice and rugged looks enhanced his appeal in that very stylistic genre.

His first notable role was in The Killers (1946), which opens with McGraw and fellow heavy William Conrad as the two hitmen who terrorize a small-town diner in their search for double-crossing hoodlum Burt Lancaster.

McGraw was unbilled in The Farmer's Daughter (1947) and Brute Force (1947) and had small roles in The Big Fix (1947) and The Long Night (1947). He had slightly bigger parts in On the Old Spanish Trail (1947), a Roy Rogers Western, and some noirs, Roses Are Red (1947) and The Gangster (1947).

McGraw's parts remained small in T-Men (1947) for Anthony Mann, The Hunted (1948), Berlin Express (1948), Hazard (1948), and Blood on the Moon (1948). He had a bigger role in Once More, My Darling (1949), then went back to small parts in Reign of Terror (1949) and Border Incident (1949) for Mann, and The Story of Molly X (1949).

McGraw moved up to third billing in the noir The Threat (1949). He played a cop in Side Street (1950) for Mann and a gangster in Ma and Pa Kettle Go to Town (1951). He played Perry Smith's (Robert Blake) father in "In Cold Blood" (1967).

Leading man
 
McGraw was finally given a leading role in RKO's Armored Car Robbery (1950) directed by Richard Fleischer. He played a gangster in His Kind of Woman (1951), then had the lead in Roadblock (1951) as "Honest Joe," the insurance investigator turned thief by love.

Fleischer used McGraw in the lead of The Narrow Margin (1952). He was a sergeant in One Minute to Zero (1952) and War Paint (1953) and was a villain in Thunder Over the Plains (1954).

McGraw's other notable roles were as Kirk Douglas's gladiator trainer in the epic Spartacus (1960) and as "The Preacher" in the science fiction film A Boy and His Dog.

Television
After appearing in radio, including the 03/13/1949 episode "Rubin Callaway's Pictures" of the noir-ish detective radio program "Pat Novak for Hire", McGraw moved to television.  In the 1954-1955 television season, McGraw starred as the character Mike Waring in the 39-episode syndicated series Adventures of the Falcon. The series updated the original Falcon premise to portray Waring as a secret agent in the Cold War.  He also starred in the first television version of Casablanca (1955), taking Humphrey Bogart's role as Rick Blaine.  Additionally, he had the role of Captain Hughes in The Smith Family. 

In 1963, McGraw played Dr. Simon Oliver in the pilot of Diagnosis: Danger, a medical drama. He later had various single-appearance roles in television episodes such as the gruff and menacing Sheriff Gains in "The Gamble," an installment of the NBC western series Bonanza.

In 1964, he guest starred on Gunsmoke as “Albert Calvin”; a rich farm owner who lets jealousy ruin his life and drives him to murder in “Bently” (S9E28). He is suspected of this crime by “Chester Goode” (Dennis Weaver) in Weaver’s final role on the series.

In 1960, McGraw played United States Army scout Tom Barrows in the episode "The Scout" on the ABC/Desilu Western television series The Life and Legend of Wyatt Earp starring Hugh O'Brian. Though he has an Apache wife, Barrows is known for his attacks on Apache warriors. He is called "The Listener" because he cuts off and wears the ears of the Indians he has killed. The Indians retaliate by killing Barrows's wife. McGraw also appeared in an episode of The Untouchables titled "The Jake Lingle Killing." This was notable as a pre-Hawaii Five-O Jack Lord was the lead hero in the show instead of Ness. He also portrayed an trigger-happy rear admiral in an episode of Voyage to the Bottom of the Sea titled "The Sky is Falling." Late in his career, McGraw performed too as a voice actor, providing voice-over narrations for several productions. He portrayed a boat captain in "Harbor Division," a 1973 episode of Adam-12. He also appeared in 1973 in Hawkins: Death and the Maiden, a TV movie that served as the pilot for the series Hawkins starring James Stewart.

Personal life
McGraw married Freda Choy Kitt in 1938, and had one daughter. They divorced in 1968. 

On July 29, 1980, he died accidentally at his home in Studio City, California, slipping in the bathroom and falling through a glass shower door, causing several cuts, including a gash to his arm that severed the brachial artery. Paramedics arrived after he bled to death.

Honors and awards
In recognition of his contributions to the entertainment industry as an actor, McGraw was awarded a star on the Hollywood Walk of Fame in Los Angeles, California on February 8, 1960. His star is located at 6927 Hollywood Boulevard.

Filmography

  The Undying Monster (1942) as Strud Strudwick (uncredited)
  The Moon Is Down (1943) as Ole (uncredited)
  Tonight We Raid Calais (1943) as German Corporal (uncredited)
  They Came to Blow Up America (1943) as Zellerbach
  Two Tickets to London (1943) as Hendrik (uncredited)
  Mechanized Patrolling (1943) as Cpl. McGraw
  Destroyer (1943) as Assistant Chief Engineer (uncredited)
  Corvette K-225 (1943) as Chief Engineer (uncredited)
  The Mad Ghoul (1943) as Garrity
  The Impostor (1944) as Menessier
  The Seventh Cross (1944) as Allbright (uncredited)
  The Killers (1946) as Al
  The Farmer's Daughter (1947) as Fisher, Finley's Henchman (uncredited)
  The Big Fix (1947) as Armiston
  The Long Night (1947) as Policeman Stevens
  Brute Force (1947) as Andy (uncredited)
  On the Old Spanish Trail (1947) as Harry Blaisdell
  Roses Are Red (1947) as Duke Arno
  The Gangster (1947) as Dugas
  T-Men (1947) as Moxie
  The Hunted (1948) as Detective
  Berlin Express (1948) as USFET Col. Johns (uncredited)
  Hazard (1948) as Chick
  Blood on the Moon (1948) as Milo Sweet
  Once More, My Darling (1949) as Herman Schmelz, Chauffeur
  Reign of Terror (1949) as Sergeant
  Border Incident (1949) as Jeff Amboy
  The Story of Molly X (1949) as Police Capt. Breen
  The Threat (1949) as Arnold 'Red' Kluger
  Side Street (1949) as Det. Stan Simon
  Ma and Pa Kettle Go to Town (1950) as Shotgun Mike Munger
  Armored Car Robbery (1950) as Lt. Jim Cordell
  Double Crossbones (1951) as Capt. Ben Wickett
  His Kind of Woman (1951) as Thompson / Narrator
  Roadblock (1951) as Joe Peters
  The Narrow Margin (1952) as Det. Sgt. Walter Brown
  One Minute to Zero (1952) as Sfc. Baker
  War Paint (1953) as Sgt. Clarke
  Thunder Over the Plains (1953) as Ben Westman
  Loophole (1954) as Gus Slavin
  The Bridges at Toko-Ri (1955) as Cmdr. Wayne Lee
  Away All Boats (1956) as Lieut. Mike O'Bannion
  Toward the Unknown (1956) as Col. 'Mickey' McKee
  The Cruel Tower (1956) as Harry 'Stretch' Clay
  Joe Butterfly (1957) as Sgt. Jim McNulty
  Slaughter on Tenth Avenue (1957) as Lt. Anthony Vosnick
  Joe Dakota (1957) as Cal Moore
  Saddle the Wind (1958) as Larry Venables
  The Defiant Ones (1958) as Capt. Frank Gibbons
  Twilight for the Gods (1958) as Yancy
  The Man in the Net (1959) as Sheriff Steve Ritter
  The Wonderful Country (1959) as Dr. Herbert J. Stovall
  Spartacus (1960) as Marcellus
  Cimarron (1960) as Bob Yountis
  The Horizontal Lieutenant (1962) as Col. Charles Korotny
  The Birds (1963) as Sebastian Sholes, Fisherman in Diner
  It's a Mad, Mad, Mad, Mad World (1963) as Lt. Matthews
  Nightmare in Chicago (1964) as Harry Brockman
  In Cold Blood (1967) as Tex Smith
  The Busy Body (1967) as Fred Harwell
  Hang 'Em High (1968) as Sheriff Ray Calhoun
  Pendulum (1969) as Deputy Chief John P. Hildebrand
  Tell Them Willie Boy Is Here (1969) as Sheriff Frank Wilson
  Johnny Got His Gun (1971) as Mike Burkeman
  Chandler (1971) as Bernie Oakman
  The Night Stalker (1972) as Chief Masterson
  The Longest Night (1972) as Father Chase
  A Boy and His Dog (1975) as Preacher
  The Killer Inside Me (1976) as Howard Hendricks
  Twilight's Last Gleaming (1977) as Air Force Gen. Peter Crane (final film role)

References

External links

 
 
 

1914 births
1980 deaths
Accidental deaths from falls
Accidental deaths in California
American male stage actors
American male film actors
American male radio actors
American male television actors
Deaths from bleeding
Male actors from Des Moines, Iowa
Male actors from Greater Los Angeles
Military personnel from Iowa
20th-century American male actors
People from Studio City, Los Angeles
Western (genre) television actors